Shawn Jones may refer to:

Shawn Jones (American football) (born 1970)
Shawn Jones (basketball) (born 1992)
Shawn Jones (musician) (born 1976), American singer and songwriter